A list of films produced in France in 1994.

Notes

See also
 1994 in France

External links
 French films of 1994 at the Internet Movie Database
French films of 1994 at Cinema-francais.fr

1994
Films
Lists of 1994 films by country or language